Holcocera increta is a moth in the family Blastobasidae. It was described by Edward Meyrick in 1930. It is found in northern Vietnam.

References

increta
Moths described in 1930